The Bethel Inn Resort is a full service, four-season resort located in Maine's Mahoosuc Mountains on the village common of Bethel, Maine offering fine and casual dining, golf, skiing, spa services, a health club, lake house, conference center and 200 acres of resort activities.

History

The main inn building opened in 1913. and many of its early guests were patients of Dr. John George Gehring, to whom the Inn was dedicated. A pioneer of combining psychological and physical therapies, his wealthy patients came from all over New England and the Midwest. As the business expanded with added buildings, recreational guests came “for the season” to enjoy the seclusion of Bethel and the cool mountain air of the nearby mountain range.

As vacationing habits changed, the Inn struggled mightily under a succession of owners until February 22, 1979 when the banks stepped in and closed it. Advertising executive, Richard D. Rasor, bought the property in May, 1979, hoping to apply modern communications and marketing practices to revive and expand the property. 

In 1986 a $7,500,000 construction project began, adding 100 acres, new traditional guest rooms, 53 luxury condominiums, a golf course expansion to 18 holes, a conference center and health club with an outdoor, year-round heated pool.

Present day
Reborn since closing in 1979, the resort has 150 guest rooms, hosting 59,000 guest-overnights a year.

References

Buildings and structures in Oxford County, Maine
Hotel buildings completed in 1913
Hotels in Maine
Resorts in Maine
Tourist attractions in Oxford County, Maine
1913 establishments in Maine